Halysidota tucumanicola is a moth of the family Erebidae. It was described by Embrik Strand in 1919. It is found in Argentina.

The larvae possibly feed on Celtis and Trema species.

References

Halysidota
Moths described in 1919